LeRoy B. Andrews, or commonly Roy Andrews, (June 27, 1896 – July 1978) was an American football player and coach. He played college football at Pittsburg State University. In 1923, he played for the St. Louis All Stars. From 1924 to 1927, he was a player-coach for the Kansas City Blues/Cowboys and the Cleveland Bulldogs. From 1928 to 1931, he coached the Detroit Wolverines, the New York Giants, and the Chicago Cardinals.

Head coaching record

References

External links
Playing stats
Coaching stats

1896 births
Year of death missing
American football guards
Chicago Cardinals head coaches
St. Louis All-Stars players
Kansas City Cowboys (NFL) players
Cleveland Bulldogs players
Cleveland Indians-Bulldogs coaches
Kansas City Blues (NFL) players
New York Giants head coaches
Pittsburg State Gorillas football players
Players of American football from Kansas